UTV News is a television channel broadcasting news only, updated every minute since 2010, from Tirana, Albania. Originally started as Teuta TV based in Durrës, it was re-branded to UFO Education in 2007. The station is affiliated with UFO Albanian University in Tirana, Albania.

TV programs made and broadcast by UTV News

References

External links
Official website

Television networks in Albania
Television channels and stations established in 2007
Mass media in Tirana